Necdet Turhan (born 1957) is a Turkish visually impaired mountaineer and national athlete for long-distance running. In 2017 he completed a project that called for running five marathons on five different continents, and climbing five summits in five different continents.

Early life
Necdet Turhan was born in Balıkesir, Turkey, in 1957. He was schooled in Bursa due to his father's professional assignment. He lost his eyesight due to a corneal disease which began when he was 23. After finishing high school, he studied political science and public administration at the Middle East Technical University in Ankara. He graduated with honours in 1994.

Career
Turhan started mountaineering by joining the "Mountain Climbing and Winter Sports Club" at his university. He initially faced objection from the club members due to his blindness, but afterwards was allowed to take part in climbing activities. He reached the summits of Bey Dağları, Mt. Erciyes, and other peaks in Turkey. He became interested in long-distance running after he met master athletes exercising at the Bursa Atatürk Stadium. In 2000, he took part in the Istanbul Marathon, running in the  category.

As part of a project titled "Five marathons, five summits in five continents", which was sponsored by the "Bridge to Turkey Fund" of the Turkish people living in the U.S., Turhan ran the New York City Marathon (Americas) in 2002, the Athens Classic Marathon (Europe) in 2004, the Japan World Blind Marathon (Asia) in 2005, the Sydney Marathon (Australasia) in 2006, and the Egyptian Luxor Marathon (Africa) in 2007. He climbed the  Mt. Ararat (Asia) in 2007, the  Mt. Kilimanjaro (Africa) in 2008, the  Mont Blanc (Europe) in 2010, and the  Mt. Sherman (Americas) in 2014. After completing five marathons and four summits, he achieved his project goal in 2017 by climbing the  Mt. Kosciuszko (Australasia) as the fifth summit.

Personal life 
Currently, Turhan lives in Bursa.

References

Living people
1957 births
Sportspeople from Balıkesir
Sportspeople with a vision impairment
Turkish blind people
Turkish mountain climbers
Turkish male long-distance runners
Middle East Technical University alumni
Mount Ararat